Alexandra Kluge (2 April 1937 – 11 June 2017) was a German actress and medical doctor.

Alexandra Kluge was born in Halberstadt, Saxony-Anhalt, Germany. Her brother is film director Alexander Kluge.

Filmography
Yesterday Girl (1966), as Anita
Feuerlöscher E. A. Winterstein (1968)
Part-Time Work of a Domestic Slave (1973), as Roswitha
 (1983)

References 

1937 births
2017 deaths
People from Halberstadt
People from the Province of Saxony
German film actresses
Best Actress German Film Award winners
Physicians from Saxony-Anhalt
20th-century German actresses